is a Japanese actor, voice actor and narrator. He is known for doing the Japanese voice of Master Chief in the Halo Original Trilogy.

Filmography

Television animation
Tweeny Witches (2004) (Jidan)
Kekkaishi (2007) (Tessai Shishio)
Fullmetal Alchemist: Brotherhood (2009) (Master Hawkeye)
Majin Bone (2014) (Stolz / Dark Phoenix)
Sanzoku no Musume Rōnya (2014) (Borka)
Cheer Boys!! (2016) (Haruki's father)
Dragon Ball Super (2017) (Obuni)
Altair: A Record of Battles (2017) (Apollodorus)
GeGeGe no Kitarō 6th series (2018) (Dorotabō (ep 54)
One Piece: Episode of Sky Island (2018) (Dr. Honner)
Carole & Tuesday (2019) (Dann)
Great Pretender (2020) (Inspector Anderson)
Hortensia Saga (2021) (Georg Dalmas)
Delicious Party Pretty Cure (2022) (Genma Itak)

Tokusatsu
Kyuukyuu Sentai GoGo Five (1999) (Smog Psyma Beast Chanbaano) (ep 10)
Mirai Sentai Timeranger (2000) (Mercenary Org) (ep 10)
Uchu Sentai Kyuranger (2017) (Shougun DonArmage) (eps 1, 4, 8, 12 - 13, 15, 19, 21 - 25, 28 - 32, 35, 38, 41 - 48)

OVA
Mobile Suit Gundam Unicorn (2014) (Ablus)

Video games
Halo (Japanese dub, 2002) (Master Chief)
God of War (Japanese dub, 2005) (Ares)
Ace Combat: Assault Horizon (Japanese dub, 2011) (Andrei Markov)
Time Travelers (2012) (Joji Nonaka)
Super Robot Wars T (2019) (Dr.Hell)

Dubbing roles

Live-action
Liam Neeson
The Commuter (Michael MacCauley)
Cold Pursuit (Nels Coxman)
Honest Thief (Tom Dolan)
The Ice Road (Mike McCann)
Mark Strong
Mindscape (John Washington)
Welcome to the Punch (Jacob Sternwood)
Before I Go to Sleep (Dr. Nasch)
Act of Valor (Abu Shabal)
Almost Human (Detective Richard Paul (Michael Irby))
Amsterdam (Henry Norcross (Michael Shannon))
Around the World in 80 Days (Nyle Bellamy (Peter Sullivan))
Audrey (Sean Hepburn Ferrer)
Catch Me If You Can (Jack Barnes (James Brolin))
The Core (Dr. Conrad Zimsky (Stanley Tucci))
District 9 (Colonel Koobus Venter (David James))
Downton Abbey (John Bates (Brendan Coyle))
Dragonfly (Hugh Campbell (Joe Morton))
Dunkirk (Commander Bolton (Kenneth Branagh))
Escape Room: Tournament of Champions (Henry (James Frain))
Force of Execution (Ice Man (Ving Rhames))
Forsaken (Gentleman Dave Turner (Michael Wincott))
The Frozen Ground (Sgt. Lyle Haugsven (Dean Norris))
Guardians of the Galaxy (The Other (Alexis Denisof))
Hellboy (Grigori Rasputin (Karel Roden))
Hugo (Policeman (Kevin Eldon))
Inheritance (Morgan Warner / Carson Thomas (Simon Pegg))
Lilacs (Sergei (Yevgeny Tsyganov))
Machine Gun Preacher (Deng (Souléymane Sy Savané))
Mackenna's Gold (Sergeant Tibbs (Telly Savalas))
Mutant World (Mads (David LeReaney))
Neruda (Gabriel González Videla (Alfredo Castro))
No Country for Old Men (Anton Chigurh (Javier Bardem))
Nobody (The Barber (Colin Salmon))
The Perfect Weapon (Controller (Richard Tyson))
Predators (Nikolai (Oleg Taktarov))
Punch-Drunk Love (Dean Trumbell (Philip Seymour Hoffman))
River Queen (Te Kai Po (Temuera Morrison))
Saw II (Rigg (Lyriq Bent))
Scorpion (Agent Cabe Gallo (Robert Patrick))
Taken (Mark Casey (Jon Gries))
The Third Man (New Era Movies edition) (Major Calloway (Trevor Howard))
Transformers: Dark of the Moon (Defense Secretary McNamara)
True Detective (Detective Martin Hart (Woody Harrelson))
True Grit (Tom Chaney (Josh Brolin))
Vincenzo (Hong Yoo-chan (Yoo Jae-myung))
X-Men: First Class (Azazel (Jason Flemyng))

Animation
Halo Legends (Master Chief)
Happy Feet Two (Memphis)
Justice League (General Wells)
Love, Death & Robots (The Cat, Turk)
Trese (Datu Talagbusao)

References

External links
 Official agency profile 
 

1959 births
Living people
Japanese male video game actors
Japanese male voice actors
Male voice actors from Tokyo
Meiji University alumni
20th-century Japanese male actors
21st-century Japanese male actors
Aoni Production voice actors